Llamuqa (Quechua for a black stone consisting of iron with curative powers, Hispanicized spellings Llamocca, Llamoja) is a mountain with archaeological remains in the Andes of Peru, about  high. It is situated in the Arequipa Region, La Unión Province, Huaynacotas District.

By the local people Llamuqa is venerated as an apu.

See also 
 Allqa Walusa
 Lunq'u
 Mawk'allaqta

References 

Mountains of Peru
Mountains of Arequipa Region
Archaeological sites in Peru
Archaeological sites in Arequipa Region
Inca mythology